Tillandsia caulescens is a species in the genus Tillandsia. This species is native to Bolivia.

Cultivars
 Tillandsia 'Pink Surprise'

References

BSI Cultivar Registry Retrieved 11 October 2009

caulescens
Flora of Bolivia
Taxa named by Adolphe-Théodore Brongniart
Taxa named by John Gilbert Baker